Yoriaki Matsudaira (27 March 1931 – 9 January 2023) was a Japanese composer and academic.

Life and career 
Born in Tokyo, the son of composer Yoritsune, Matsudaira graduated in biology at Tokyo Metropolitan University and served as professor of physics and biology at the Rikkyo University. 

A self-taught composer who used to mix Japanese traditional music with western influences, his variegated production mainly consists of chamber music, but also includes orchestral compositions, incidental music, jazz compositions, electronic music as well as the opera Sara (1960). 

During his career Matsudaira received various awards and honors, including an Otaka prize and a Purple Ribbon Medal of Honor. He died of pneumonia on 9 January 2023, at the age of 91.

References

External links
 
  Yoriaki Matsudaira at Museum of Modern Art

1931 births
2023 deaths
20th-century classical composers
20th-century Japanese composers
20th-century Japanese male musicians
21st-century classical composers
21st-century Japanese composers
21st-century Japanese male musicians
Academics from Tokyo
Japanese classical composers
Japanese contemporary classical composers
Japanese male classical composers
Japanese opera composers
Japanese record producers
Jazz-influenced classical composers
Male opera composers
Musicians from Tokyo
Recipients of the Medal with Purple Ribbon
Academic staff of Rikkyo University
Tokyo Metropolitan University alumni